The 2021 Overwatch League playoffs was the postseason tournament of the 2021 Overwatch League regular season. The tournament began on September 21 and concluded with the 2021 Grand Finals, the fourth championship match of the Overwatch League (OWL) on September 25.

Eight teams contested the OWL playoffs, a double-elimination tournament, with the final two teams remaining in the tournament advancing to the Grand Finals. Each playoff match was originally planned take place at Esports Stadium Arlington in Arlington, Texas, aside from the final at the Galen Center in Los Angeles, California. However, due to increasing threat of COVID-19 and the delta variant, the matches were shifted to be played online.

The defending OWL champions were the San Francisco Shock, who won the title against the Seoul Dynasty in the 2020 OWL Grand Finals. The Shanghai Dragons swept the Atlanta Reign in the Grand Finals to win their first OWL championship.

Format 
Eight teams qualified for the season playoffs. In the league's West region, five teams qualified: the top three teams based on the Western regular season standings and the top two teams from the Western play-in tournament. In the league's East region, three teams qualified: the top two teams based on the Eastern regular season standings and the top team from the Eastern play-in tournament. The team with the most league points between the top seed in the West and top seed in the East was the first overall seed, while the other was the second seed. The team with the most league points between the second seed in the West and second seed in the East was the third overall seed, while the other was the fourth seed. The third seeded team in the West was the fifth overall seed. The three teams that qualified for the playoffs via the play-in tournaments were seeded sixth through eight based on league points. Any ties in league points were broken by the league's tiebreaking rules.

The playoffs were a double-elimination tournament. The top three seeds selected their opponent from seeds five through eight for the first round of the tournament, with the top seed selecting first and the third seed selecting last. In each match, the higher-seeded team had the choice of which map to play first from a pool of maps. Each following map was chosen by the losing team from the previous map. The winner of each match was determined by which team wins three maps first, aside from the Grand Finals, which was first-to-four. No hero pools, a system in which some heroes are unplayable, was used in the postseason.

Venues 

All matches were originally planned to be played at Esports Stadium Arlington in Arlington, Texas, aside from the Grand Finals, which was to take place at the Galen Center in Los Angeles, California. Although several live matches were held in the regular season in limited formats, the playoffs and Grand Finals were to be one of the first esports live events held in North America since the COVID-19 pandemic. 

On August 25, 2021, due to visa difficulties and concerns surrounding Delta variant, all in-person playoff events were cancelled. To minimize latency between the East and West teams, the West region playoff teams travelled to the University of Hawaiʻi at Mānoa and played at the Innovation Lab and Information Technology Center buildings, while the East region teams played in their home country. The broadcasts were hosted from an outdoor stage at the Moana Hotel in Honolulu.

Participants

Bracket

Matches

Upper round 1

Lower round 1

Upper round 2

Lower round 2

Upper final

Lower round 3

Lower final

Grand Finals

Winnings 
Teams in the season playoffs competed for a total prize pool of million, with the payout division detailed below.

References 

Overwatch
Playoffs